Marc Tenas Ureña (born 30 May 2001) is a Spanish professional footballer who plays as a forward for Spanish club Alavés B.

Club career
Tenas began playing football with his local club Vic Riuprimer, before joining the youth academies of Barcelona, Cornellà and finally Atlético Madrid in 2016. He began his senior career with Atlético Madrid B in 2019. Tenas transferred to Alavés on 2 September 2021, initially joining as part of their reserves. He made his La Liga and professional debut with Alavés in a 2–1 win over Espanyol on 11 May 2022, coming on as a substitute in the 76th minute.

International career
Tenas is a youth international for Spain, having represented the Spain U18s, U19s, and U20s.

Personal life
Tenas was born into a family of footballers, as his grandfather, and father were both football goalkeepers. His twin brother, Arnau, is a professional football goalkeeper currently at Barcelona B.

References

External links
 
 
 

2001 births
Living people
Footballers from Vic
Spanish footballers
Spain youth international footballers
Association football forwards
La Liga players
Primera Federación players
Tercera Federación players
Deportivo Alavés players
Deportivo Alavés B players
Atlético Madrid B players
Twin sportspeople